Impasto is a technique used in painting, where paint is laid on an area of the surface thickly, usually thick enough that the brush or painting-knife strokes are visible. Paint can also be mixed right on the canvas. When dry, impasto provides texture; the paint appears to be coming out of the canvas.

Etymology 
The word impasto is Italian in origin; in which it means "dough" or "mixture"; related to the verb , "to knead", or "to paste". Italian usage of  includes both a painting and a potting technique.

Mediums 
Oil paint is the traditional medium for impasto painting, due to its thick consistency and slow drying time. Acrylic paint can also be used for impasto by adding heavy body acrylic gels. Impasto is generally not used in watercolor or tempera without the addition of thickening agent due to the inherent thinness of these media. An artist working in pastels can produce a limited impasto effect by pressing a soft pastel firmly against the paper.

Purposes 
The impasto technique serves several purposes. First, it makes the light reflect in a particular way, giving the artist additional control over the play of light in the painting. Second, it can add expressiveness to the painting, with the viewer being able to notice the strength and speed by which the artist applied the paint. Third, impasto can push a piece from a painting to a three-dimensional sculptural rendering. The first objective was originally sought by masters such as Rembrandt, Titian, and Vermeer, to represent folds in clothes or jewels: it was then juxtaposed with a more delicate painting style. Much later, the French Impressionists created pieces covering entire canvases with rich impasto textures. Vincent van Gogh used it frequently for aesthetics and expression. Abstract expressionists such as Hans Hofmann and Willem de Kooning also made extensive use of it, motivated in part by a desire to create paintings which dramatically record the action of painting itself. Still more recently, Frank Auerbach has used such heavy impasto that some of his paintings become nearly three-dimensional.

Impasto gives texture to the painting, meaning it can be opposed to more flat, smooth, or blended painting styles.

Artists 
Many artists have used the impasto technique. Some of the more notable ones including: Rembrandt van Rijn, Diego Velázquez, Vincent van Gogh, Jackson Pollock, and Willem de Kooning.

See also
 List of art techniques

References

External links
 
 Lindberg, Ted. Alfred Currier: Impasto
 National Portrait Gallery, London. Impasto
 Tate Britain Gallery, London. Frank Auerbach, Bacchus & Ariadne.
 How to thin acrylic paint Easy Achieve Beautiful.

Artistic techniques
Painting techniques